The Nijmegen–Venlo railway, also called Maaslijn, is a railway line in the Netherlands running from Nijmegen to Venlo, passing through Boxmeer and Venray. The line was opened in 1883. Between 2006 and 2016, passenger transport on the line was exploited by Veolia. From 2016 to 2031, Arriva will provide train services on the line.

Future
The line is planned to be electrified in 2024. Once this is completed it is planned to operate additional fast services along the line. ProRail halted the project in April 2022, citing a rise in the cost of materials and other problems due to the Russo-Ukraine War.

Stations
The main interchange stations on the Nijmegen–Venlo railway are:

Nijmegen: to Arnhem and 's-Hertogenbosch 
Venlo: to Roermond, Düsseldorf and Eindhoven

References

Railway lines in the Netherlands
Railway lines in Limburg (Netherlands)
Railway lines in North Brabant
Transport in Land van Cuijk
Transport in Venlo
Nijmegen
Venray